On 7 November 2015, Ma Ying-jeou, President of the Republic of China (Taiwan; ROC), and Xi Jinping, General Secretary of the Chinese Communist Party (CCP) and President of the People's Republic of China (Mainland China; PRC), met in Singapore. The meeting was the first between the political leaders of the two sides of the Taiwan Strait (the two Chinas) since the end of the Chinese Civil War in 1950 and the first since the meeting between Chiang Kai-shek and Mao Zedong in Chongqing during the Double Tenth Agreement in August 1945.

Background

During his 2012 presidential campaign, Ma Ying-jeou had stated in November 2011 that if reelected, he would "absolutely never meet with mainland leaders over the future four years". However, Ma's administration had repeatedly proposed a meeting between him and Xi Jinping since November 2012, after Xi was elected General Secretary of the CCP (Paramount leader). The 2015 meeting was proposed by Taiwan Affairs Office (TAO) Director Zhang Zhijun during a discussion on cross-strait affairs with Mainland Affairs Council (MAC) Minister Andrew Hsia in Guangzhou, China in October 2015. Initially, Hsia proposed that the meeting take place during the APEC Philippines 2015 in Manila, Philippines. However, Zhang found the recommendation to be unsuitable. Later, Hsia suggested the meeting occur in Singapore, where the Wang–Koo summit was held on 27–29 April 1993, the first cross-strait negotiation after a meeting one year earlier in British Hong Kong. Details of the meeting were leaked by Taiwanese newspaper Liberty Times on 3 November 2015, and were officially confirmed over the following days.

Preparation
Due to the political dispute between the two governments, officials on both sides agreed that the ROC leader and PRC leader would address each other as "mister" and that they would participate as "Leader of Taiwan" and "Leader of Mainland China" respectively. Journalists from Taiwan – accustomed to using Minguo calendar years since the founding of the Republic of China in 1912 – had to be reissued with identification sporting a date based on the Gregorian calendar system preferred in Mainland China.

The ROC Presidential Office stated that Ma intended for this meeting to "consolidate peace and maintain the status quo." President Ma and a group of his top advisors, including Presidential Office Secretary-General Tseng Yung-chuan and Deputy Secretary-General Hsiao Hsu-tsen, National Security Council Secretary-General Kao Hua-chu and advisor Chiu Kun-shuan, MAC Minister Andrew Hsia and Deputy Minister Wu Mei-hung, attended the meeting with him.

Reporters from around the world began setting up their equipment at the Shangri-La Hotel on 5 November. Hotel staff restricted media to the meeting's main venue, the Shangri-La's ballroom. Media attendance of the meeting was limited to 400 personnel due to security concerns. Guest access to the ballroom had been barred beginning from 2 a.m. local time on 7 November.

Meeting chronology

Leaders' arrival in Singapore

On 5 November 2015, Xi Jinping, the General Secretary of the CCP, departed from Beijing to Vietnam as his first state visit to the nation at the invitation of General Secretary of the Communist Party of Vietnam, Nguyễn Phú Trọng and President Trương Tấn Sang. Xi continued his state visit to Singapore and arrived at the island nation on 6 November 2015 with his wife Peng Liyuan.

Ma Ying-jeou took a chartered flight operated by China Airlines from Taipei Songshan Airport to Singapore on the day of the meeting. His aircraft was escorted by Republic of China Air Force fighter jets. After landing at Singapore Changi Airport at 10:30 am, Ma headed to the Four Seasons Hotel briefly where he was greeted by members of the Taiwan Business Association before meeting Xi.

Meeting

At 3:00 pm Singapore Time, the leaders met at the Shangri-La Hotel Singapore and shook hands for about a minute in front of the assembled press. After the handshake, Xi and Ma respectively gave speeches. With a 30-second delay, the CCTV broadcast Xi's speech to the PRC and truncated transmission immediately after their president had finished; Ma's speech was not broadcast. However, NetEase, which was carrying the CCTV feed, immediately switched to Phoenix Television to broadcast Ma's speech to the Chinese audience. The closed-door talks followed at 3:20 pm.

Post-meeting press conference

After the meeting, representative of the People's Republic of China, Taiwan Affairs Office Director Zhang Zhijun, conveyed words from Xi that the meeting was a new page in history for cross-strait relations. He reiterated Xi's four points to Ma, which are adhering to the 1992 Consensus, developing cross-strait peace, expanding the effects of the prosperity to more public segments and cooperatively pursuing the Chinese renaissance. Zhang added that Xi agreed to establish the cross-strait hotline that can help both sides communicate with each other, avoid miscalculation and also to deal during emergencies and important matters. Taiwan's participation in the Asian Infrastructure Investment Bank was also encouraged. Xi told Ma that both sides are one family, emphasizing the same cultural and blood lineages of both sides of the Taiwan Strait and the improved relations over the past seven years. Ma told Xi that both sides should respect each other's value and way of life, and stating his five remarks, which are consolidating the 1992 Consensus, downgrading tension by solving problems peacefully and establishing cooperative efforts to revitalize the Chinese nation.

Ma began a press conference at 4:50 pm, during which he highlighted the importance of the fine details of the 1992 Consensus. Pointing out that the atmosphere of the meeting was harmonious, Ma said that Xi's words were conducive to the practicalities of cross-strait matters. He said that both sides talked about consolidating the 1992 Consensus, and adherence to the One-China policy, but maintained that both sides are free to interpret its meaning. However, he mentioned that the 1992 Consensus was reached on the basis of "different interpretation" of "One China", not "two Chinas, one China and one Taiwan, or Taiwan independence," none of which are permitted under the ROC Constitution.

Dinner
In the evening after the meeting, both leaders had dinner at the hotel. They were served crayfish, fried asparagus and spicy noodles and split the bill upon finishing the meal. Xi and Ma sat next to each other at a round table to avoid having someone sitting in the host position at the head of a rectangular table.

They were served with liquor from Kinmen, site of the Battle of Guningtou during the Chinese Civil War and the First and Second Taiwan Strait Crises, to represent the state of cross-strait exchanges turning from war to peace. The two Kaoliang wine bottles presented by Kao Hua-chu (ROC) were produced in 1990, the year the Kinmen Agreement was signed. They also drank moutai, and rice wine produced in Matsu.

Gifts were also exchanged. Xi Jinping gave Ma Ying-jeou an artwork by Mainland Chinese painter Liu Dawei (刘大为/劉大爲). Xi received a ceramic Formosan blue magpie by Lee Kuo-chin (李國欽/李国钦 Lǐ Guóqīn) from Ma, meant to exemplify the uniqueness of Taiwan.

Reactions

Republic of China (Taiwan)

Ma administration and the ruling party

During an international news conference prior to the meeting, President Ma said that the two sides of the Taiwan Strait should continue to mitigate their animosity, avoid deviating from the right path and expand exchanges and cooperation. He asserted that the meeting was not for his legacy or for improving the popularity of the Kuomintang, but for the good of the next generation. Foreign Minister David Lin said the Ma–Xi meeting will focus on cross-strait peace and stability without involving any political negotiations nor leading to any downgrading of Taiwan's status, but that it would be held under the principle of equality and dignity with proper courtesy.

The Kuomintang described the meeting as a "milestone" in Cross-Strait relations.

Opposition parties
There was a sense of betrayal among many Taiwanese as Ma Ying-jeou in late 2011 had promised that he would "absolutely never meet with mainland leaders over the next four years". Presidential candidate and incumbent chairwoman of the Democratic Progressive Party (DPP) Tsai Ing-wen called the proposed meeting a manipulation of the January elections and described the decision-making process as opaque. She added that the meeting has caused a wave of questions and public doubts as people have grown to mistrust the administration's plan for cross-strait relations. The Liberty Times echoed Tsai's concerns that parliament and the public had been excluded from the decision-making. After the meeting, Tsai criticized President Ma for making no reference to preserving Taiwan's democracy and freedom. She maintained that only the upcoming elections can decide Taiwan's future.

The youth division of the Taiwan Solidarity Union, formerly the third largest political party in Taiwan, threw colored smoke bombs over the cordons surrounding the Presidential Office Building.

Third-force party leaders opposed the meeting. New Power Party (NPP) Chairman Huang Kuo-chang accused Ma of attempting to burnish his legacy at the expense of changing the direction of national security policy, and trampling on Taiwan's democracy and sovereignty by bypassing the Legislative Yuan. He argued that Ma's trip would violate his 2011 promises in which Ma said that he would not meet with Chinese leaders if re-elected. Social Democratic Party chairman  said "Ma doesn't have any mandate for surprising us with this meeting – ever since last year's Sunflower Movement, it has been clear that the handling of cross-strait relations by the governing party is not trusted by the people." Green Party Taiwan co-convener Lee Ken-cheng added it was not clear whether Ma had made concessions to arrange the meeting. Lee further stated that calling a meeting about 70 days before the general elections, made it "obvious that China wants to use this to interfere with Taiwan's elections."

Civil society
The Chinese National Federation of Industries, Taipei Chamber of Commerce, and Allied Association for Science Park Industries, all of which are Taiwanese business organizations, expressed support for the meeting, which is perceived to help improve Taiwan's economic prospects.

Others such as a number of intellectuals and legal experts in Taiwan published articles calling on the Legislative Yuan to initiate impeachment proceedings against Ma, as they argue the handling of the meeting has violated the requirements of the due Constitutional procedures. Some scholars also asked for the intervention of the legislative body and the Constitutional Court to prevent Ma from attending the meeting.

On the summit day, hundreds of angry protesters walked along a three-kilometer route from the Ministry of Economic Affairs building to the Presidential Office, condemning Ma's warm exchange with many fearing that Taiwan's democracy is being excessively influenced by China. "I believe this is getting to the level of treason." said Lin Hsiu-hsin, vice chairman of the Taiwan Association of University Professors. Protests also occurred at the Legislative Yuan and Taipei Songshan Airport.

People's Republic of China (Mainland)
TAO Director Zhang Zhijun said that the scheduled meeting between the two sides is a milestone in cross-strait relations, would help enhance trust across the Taiwan Strait and consolidate common political background, and the meeting would also push forward peaceful development of cross-strait relations and safeguard peace and stability in the region.

Singapore
The Ministry of Foreign Affairs said that the meeting is a milestone in the history of cross-strait relations since 1949. As a close and longstanding friend of both Mainland China and Taiwan, Singapore was happy to facilitate and be the venue for their direct dialogue.

United Kingdom
Chris Patten, the Conservative politician who became the last governor of Hong Kong, said that the meeting was clearly set up to confer advantage to the Kuomintang in the forthcoming presidential elections. He however added that "peaceful reunification of the mainland and Taiwan remains unlikely, unless it takes place – as China continues to promise – on the basis of one country, two systems. But the Taiwanese cannot be very reassured by what they see happening today in Hong Kong, which was promised the same thing before its return to China in 1997."

United States
U.S. State Department spokesperson Elizabeth Trudeau stated that the U.S. expected "constructive dialogue" to occur, though no statements were announced upon the conclusion of the meeting. Former National Security Council member Evan Medeiros credited the warming of relations that led to the meeting to U.S. President Barack Obama's "pivot to Asia."

References

External links 

 
 Coverage of the meeting by the South China Morning Post

Cross-Strait relations
2015 in Taiwan
2015 in China
2015 in Singapore
2015 in international relations
November 2015 events in Asia
2015 conferences
Xi Jinping